A painting knife is an artist's tool  with a flexible steel blade used to apply paint to the canvas.

It has a pointed tip, lowered or "cranked" like a trowel, suited for painting on canvas. 
The blade can be of different lengths and shapes : triangular, rectangular or more diamond like.

A painting knife is different from a palette knife which has a straight wide blade and a rounded tip, better suited for mixing paints on the palette.

Knife painters
Famous knife painters are: Titian, John Constable, Bill Alexander, Bob Ross, Frans Hals, Rembrandt, Fragonard, Courbet, Nicolas de Staël, Marcelle Ferron, and Jean-Paul Riopelle.

See also 

 Palette (painting)

Knives
Painting materials